Veldskoene ("FELT-skoona") or colloquially Vellies ("FELL-ys"), are South African walking shoes made from vegetable-tanned leather or soft rawhide uppers attached to a leather footbed and rubber sole by a method known as Stitchdown construction and done without tacks or nails.

History 
The name comes from Afrikaans vel ("skin"), later assimilated with veld ("field"), and skoene ("shoes"). Their design is believed to be based on the traditional Khoisan footwear observed by these settlers and were adopted in the 17th century by the first Dutch settlers in South Africa. The footwear was later embedded into the Afrikaner psyche when Velskoene were used as the footwear of the Great Trek. Easy to make, lightweight and extremely tough, Vellies became part of South African, Zimbabwean (previously Rhodesian) and Namibian culture.

Nathan Clark's shoe company, C&J Clark, made the desert boot famous, modeled after the same round toe and style of Veldskoene. Clark was inspired by the shape and design of Veldskoene he discovered for sale in the bazars of Cairo, which were imported to Egypt from South Africa. At first desert boots were for the youths. In England, the mods wore them, in Paris, it was the art students and in America the beatniks stomped around in them. Pretty soon high fashion began taking notes from these counter-culture kids, reappropriating Clarks for fashion shoots in magazines, and runway shows.

They are sometimes considered light boots, and can essentially be considered a subset of chukka boots or desert boots although vellies tend to have a lower topline. Veldskoene soles are sometimes cut from old car tyres rather than crepe rubber; the leather used varies with local supply. In Namibia, kudu and seal leather is commonly used.

References

External links 

 Official website

South African fashion
African clothing
Afrikaans words and phrases